US Post Office-Painted Post is a historic post office building located at Painted Post in Steuben County, New York.  It was designed in 1937 and built in 1937-1938 and is one of a number of post offices in New York State designed by the Office of the Supervising Architect of the Treasury Department, Louis A. Simon. It is a one-story, three bay structure clad in red brick in the Colonial Revival style.  The interior features a 1939 mural by Amy Jones titled "Recording the Victory" and depicting a Revolutionary War scene.

It was listed on the National Register of Historic Places in 1989.

References

Painted Post
Colonial Revival architecture in New York (state)
Government buildings completed in 1938
Buildings and structures in Steuben County, New York
National Register of Historic Places in Steuben County, New York